Kamloops Water Aerodrome  is located  west northwest of Kamloops, British Columbia, Canada.

The airport is classified as an airport of entry by Nav Canada and is staffed by the Canada Border Services Agency (CBSA). CBSA officers at this airport can handle general aviation aircraft only, with no more than 15 passengers.

See also
Kamloops Airport

References

Seaplane bases in British Columbia
Transport in Kamloops
Registered aerodromes in British Columbia